TVB-Europe is an online television service that streams content from Hong Kong's Television Broadcasts Limited (TVB) to subscribers in Europe.

Initially established as The Chinese Channel Limited (TCC) in 1994 as a satellite television broadcaster based in the United Kingdom, it broadcast to 48 countries in Europe. The company became a wholly owned subsidiary of TVB in 2003 and the on-air identity was re-branded as TVB-Europe, though it retained "The Chinese Channel Limited" as a legal identity.

After transitioning from a satellite service into an online one, it was announced on December 9, 2014, that "The Chinese Channel Limited" was in administration, as TVB Europe the service is now run as part of TVB International operating from Hong Kong.

The satellite broadcasts of TVB Europe is now replaced by TVB Anywhere since the launch of the new platform.

History

The Chinese Channel Limited was established in 1994 as a joint venture between Pacific Media PLC and Shaw Media Corporation, a company controlled by Markus and Darren Shaw the grand nephews of TVB's former chairman and founder Run Run Shaw.

From the very beginning TVB was the source of the majority of TCC's programming though not exclusively so. From the late 1970s to the early 1990s the consumer of Chinese language programming in the United Kingdom was by videotape and TVB had established official video rental outlets for its dramas, however the official outlets did not have the geographical coverage to compete with videotape pirates who could always undercut it on price. TVB found that its programs were being taped as they were broadcast in Hong Kong, mailed abroad, copied and shared between friends and hawked as a sideline by businesses serving the Chinese community. By having TCC as an affiliate TVB could better profit from its own products. However, as the fledgling channel sought to build up its subscriber base, (advertising revenue has always been weak given the fractured nature of the target audience) financial support from TVB became increasingly important leading to a rebranding of TCC as TVBS-Europe, (TVB Satellite-Europe). Station identification, colours, logos and jingles became variations of that used by TVB for it Jade brand in Hong Kong, and the station was no longer referred to on air or its promotional material as 時視 (CC).

In 2003, TVB brought out the remaining partner to assume full control of TCC. The company initially shied away from branding itself outright as TVB-Europe; there being a broadcasting industry trade magazine, now owned by NewBay Media, with a similar name, styled TVBEurope.

Beginning in 2013 TVB-Europe began moving away from being a satellite broadcaster to being an online one with the goal of a planned switch off of its satellite service in late summer/early autumn of 2014. In late 2013 it began moving existing subscribers to its online service TVB-Anywhere, a TV Everywhere service, with the offer of reduced subscriptions and free set top boxes. The move to becoming an online service followed a period which saw a reduction of the company's physical presence in Europe, for example the closing of its London newsroom at Teddington Studios, with the loss of 20 jobs, and having the news recorded in Hong Kong for broadcast in Europe.

The owners declared that it would seek administration for "The Chinese Channel Limited" on 9 December 2014 because of financial reasons, making its remaining 30 UK and 3 French staff redundant. The subscriber base and the TVB Anywhere service has now been transferred to and is now managed as a part of TVB's TVB International (TVBI).

Programming
From the very start TVB produced programs formed the majority of the channels programming, in addition to TVB programs, Japanese and Korean dramas purchased by TVB, and dubbed for broadcast in Hong Kong, also formed part of the channels early scheduling. In house television program production was limited to local news and community interest programs, this programming ceased with the closing of the local newsroom.

As a satellite service TVB-Europe offered 5 channels, the main one being modelled on TVB Jade, in addition to this flagship channel, for an additional supplement to the subscription, four extra channels were available these being a lifestyle channel, a news channel, a golden oldies channel and a children's/educational channel. In addition to material produced by the main TVB studios in Hong Kong, material produced by TVB's Taiwanese subsidiary TVBS was also shown on the extra channels, but very rarely on the main channel.

With the rise of online streaming, would be pirates had access to TVB programmes within minutes of their broadcast in Hong Kong, and in a bid to combat this TVB moved to a strategy of same day broadcast of its key television drama serials by its overseas subsidiaries, partners and affiliates.

Initially TVB-Europe offered an inclusive package which in addition to the 5 stations previously available by satellite, included multiple channels  such as KBS World,  Phoenix Television, China Central Television, Eastern Television and other Chinese television stations; in addition to live streaming the TVB-Anywhere service also offered a seven-day catch up service, and a video on demand service. Beginning in 2017, in an effort to fight the cloning of its set top boxes, TVB-Europe replaced its first generation boxes with new ones, these boxes offer a very much reduced number of channels, and there is no longer a dedicated European channel with localised content. The available channels now consist of the TVB Jade, TVBN, TVB Entertainment News and Asian Action channels streamed, simultaneously to their broadcast in Hong Kong, with a fifth channel streaming a repeat of TVB Jade with a seven-hour time delay to scynchronise it with the time in Europe. All third party channels have now been discontinued, and the catch up service is now only for three days. Older TVB programmes as well as dramas from the defunct Asia Television are now available to either buy or be exchanged with loyalty points as part of the video on demand service.

Notes

References
FE Investigate, Pacific Media PLC completes acquisition of additional 18% of The Chinese Channel Limited.
TVB Television Broadcasts of Hong Kong Selects Eutelsat Eurobird Nine Satellite

External links

TVB
Foreign television channels broadcasting in the United Kingdom
Television channels and stations established in 1994
Chinese-language television